The Performing Arts Building is located on the Reed College campus in southeast Portland, Oregon, in the United States. The three-story, 78,000 square foot cost $28 million.

History 
A groundbreaking was slated for mid 2011. The building opened with a ribbon-cutting ceremony on September 20, 2013.

The building was designed by Opsis Architecture. The firm was recognized at the 2014 U.S. Wood Design Awards. The building's design has also been recognized by the AIA Education Facility Design Awards.

References

External links

 Performing Arts Building at Reed College
 Performing Arts Building at Opsis Architecture

2013 establishments in Oregon
Performing arts in Oregon
Reed College buildings
University and college buildings completed in 2013